The Kho Kho Federation of England (KKFE) is the governing body for the sport of Kho Kho in the United Kingdom. Established in 2014, the sport has seen a rise in popularity especially amongst the South Asian communities that reside in the UK. With the vision to take Kho Kho to the international platform.

KKFE held the first National Kho Kho Championship in 2015, where the Finchley Shakha Kho Kho Team were crowned champions.

 Wembley Kho Kho
 Leicester Kho Kho
 Sangh United Kho Kho
 North London Nighthawks
 North London Shakha
 NHSF Kingston University
 Woolwich Kho Kho
 Ashton All Stars
 East London Shakha
 Shishukunj Kho Kho

Kingston University became the first University Kho Kho team to be recognised by KKFE.

References

2014 establishments in the United Kingdom